Cow Hollow is a valley in Oregon County in the U.S. state of Missouri.

Cow Hollow was so named on account of cows which occupied its pastures.

References

Valleys of Oregon County, Missouri
Valleys of Missouri